Marek Fábry (born 7 August 1998) is a Slovak professional footballer who plays as a forward for Polish side Zagłębie Sosnowiec.

Club career

FC Nitra
He made his Fortuna Liga debut for Nitra on 10 March 2018, in a game against Senica. Fábry replaced Márius Charizopulos five minutes before stoppage time. Nitra won the game 1–0.

Despite mostly playing as a forward, Fábry had only scored one league goal for Trogári. This was on 26 April 2019, during a 2–2 tie against Železiarne Podbrezová, when he utilised a ball from youth-level international Tomáš Vestenický in the 43rd minute, to equalise the score of the game and save one point for Nitra. In the second half, Fábry was replaced by Nemanja Soković. Fábry also scored a total of six goals in six Slovnaft Cup appearances, spanning two seasons, against lower division clubs.

Dukla Prague
On 18 January 2020, it was announced that had signed with Dukla Prague, which, at the time of his arrival, was ranked fourth of sixteen and was battling for promotion in the Czech Second League. Fábry signed a three-and-half year contract. He had stated that manager Roman Skuhravý had a positive influence on his decision to sign with the club.

GKS Jastrzębie
On 20 January 2022, Fábry moved to Poland to join GKS Jastrzębie, signing for the rest of the season with an option to extend for the 2022–23 season.

Zagłębie Sosnowiec
Following GKS Jastrzębie's relegation he remained in I liga, after signing a two-year deal with Zagłębie Sosnowiec on 18 June 2022.

References

External links
 

1998 births
Sportspeople from Nitra
Living people
Slovak footballers
Slovakia youth international footballers
Slovakia under-21 international footballers
Association football forwards
FC Nitra players
Slovak Super Liga players
FK Dukla Prague players
GKS Jastrzębie players
Zagłębie Sosnowiec players
Czech National Football League players
I liga players
Expatriate footballers in the Czech Republic
Slovak expatriate sportspeople in the Czech Republic
Expatriate footballers in Poland
Slovak expatriate sportspeople in Poland